The Ninth Congress of the Republic of Colombia is the current convocation of the legislative branch of the Republic of Colombia, composed of the Senate of Colombia and the Chamber of Representatives of Colombia. It meets in Bogotá from 20 July 2022 to 20 July 2026. In total, it is made up of 108 Senators and 187 Representatives.

Article 114 of the Colombian Constitution of 1991 proclaims Congress as the highest representative body of the legislative power. According to article 114, it is up to the Congress of the Republic of Colombia to reform the Constitution, make laws and exercise political control over the government and administration. Currently, the "Legislative Observatory" of the National University of Colombia and the "Visible Congress" program of the University of Los Andes monitor the Congress of the Republic.

2022 parliamentary election 

The 2022 Colombian parliamentary election were held on Sunday, 13 March 2022, where the 289 representatives of the House of Representatives and members of the Senate were elected.

Senate

Seats by political party 
The 108 Senators were distributed by party as follows:

Senators are elected in a national constituency. The upper house is made up of 108 senators, of which 5 belong to the seats agreed upon in Havana, 2 seats to the special indigenous constituency and one seat for the presidential candidate of the formula that came second in the 2022 Colombian presidential election.

The senators are distributed by mutual agreement in 7 commissions; First Commission that is in charge of constitutional issues, Second Commission of international politics and public force, Third Commission of finance and public credit, Fourth of budget and fiscal control, Fifth of agrarian and environmental sector; Sixth of communications, public services and calamities and Seventh of labor issues.

The order of the following list obeys, if it is an open list, the vote obtained by each senator within his party and in the case of the closed list, the order in which they were ordered by the coalition or party.

Chamber of Representatives 
The 187 members of the Chamber of Representatives were distributed by party as follows:

Representatives of the Chamber 
After the 2022 Colombian parliamentary election, the Colombian Chamber of Representatives was made up of 187 legislators: 165 elected by regional constituencies (32 departments, Capital District and special constituencies of Colombians residing abroad, Afro-Colombians and indigenous communities), 5 belonging to the seats agreed upon in Havana, 16 belonging to the Special Transitory Circumscriptions of Peace, and one seat for the vice-presidential candidate of the formula that comes second in the Colombian presidential elections of 2022: 

 Liberal
 Historic Pact
 Conservative
 Party of the U
 Green Alliance
 Commons

Amazonas
 Mónica Bocanegra
 Yenica Acosta

Antioquia
 María Eugenia Lopera
 Julian Peinado
 Luis Carlos Ochoa
 David Alejandro Toro
 Susana Gómez
 Luz María Múnera
 Daniel Restrepo
 Andrés Felipe Jimenez
 Luis Miguel Lopéz
 Hernán Cadavid
 Yulieth Sánchez
 Óscar Darío Pérez
 Juan Fernando Espinal
 Green
 Elkin Opina
 Juan Camilo Londoño
 Commons
 Pedro García

Arauca
 Liberal
 German Rozo
 Radical Change
 Lina María Garrido

Atlantico
 Liberal
 Jezmi Barraza
 Dolcey Torres
 Historic Pact
 Agmeth Escaf
 Conservative
 Antonio Zabaraín D'Arce
 Radical Change
 Gersel Pérez
 Modesto Enrique Aguilera
 Betsy Pérez Arango
 Germán Gómez López

Bolívar
 Liberal
 Silvio Carrasquilla
 Historic Pact
 Dorina Hérnandez
 Conservative
 Yamil Arana
 Juana Aray Franco
 Andrés Montes
 Fernando Niño Mendoza

Boyacá
 Liberal
 Hector David Chaparro
 Historic Pact
 Pedro José Suárez Vacca
 Conservative
 Íngrid Sogamoso
 Democratic Center
 Eduard Triana Rincón
 Green
 Wilmer Castellanos
 Jaime Salamanca

References 

Current legislatures
Congress of Colombia